Kunzang Choden (born 1952) is a Bhutanese writer. She is the first Bhutanese woman to write a novel in English.

Choden was born in Bumthang District. Her parents were feudal landlords. At the age of nine, her father sent her to school in India, where she learned English. She has a BA Honours in Psychology from Indraprastha College in Delhi and a BA in Sociology from the University of Nebraska-Lincoln. She has worked for the United Nations Development Program in Bhutan. She and her Swiss husband currently live in Thimphu.

The Circle of Karma, published by Penguin Books (India) in 2005, is her first novel. It takes place in the 1950s, the initial period of imperially regulated modernization in Bhutan. The main character, a Bhutanese woman and road-builder by occupation, is forced to deal both with the traditional, restrictive gender roles of pre-modern Bhutan and the new kinds of sexism developing as men gain economic freedom. Much of the novel is also set in North India.

In 2012, Choden and her family founded the publishing house, Riyang Books, in Thimphu.

During the 2020 COVID-19 pandemic, Choden's film-maker daughter, Dechen Roder, made video recordings of her mother reading her stories and posted them to YouTube for children stuck at home during the lockdown.

Bibliography
 Folktales of Bhutan (1994) 
 Bhutanese Tales of the Yeti (1997) 
 Dawa: The Story of a Stray Dog in Bhutan (2004) 
 The Circle of Karma (2005) 
  Chilli and Cheese- Food and Society in Bhutan (2008) 
  Tales in Colour and other stories (2009) 
Membar Tsho - The Flaming Lake (2012)

References

 Chaubey, Ajay K, et al. Women Writers of the South Asian Diaspora. Jaipur: Rawat, 2020

Bhutanese writers
Bhutanese novelists
1952 births
Living people
Indraprastha College for Women alumni
Delhi University alumni
People from Bumthang District
English-language writers
Bhutanese women writers
20th-century women writers
20th-century writers
21st-century women writers
21st-century novelists
Women novelists
English-language writers from Bhutan